Charles John Fox (born 26 November 1998) is an English footballer who plays as a defender for Queen’s Park in the Scottish Championship.

Club career

Queens Park Rangers
Joining Queens Park Rangers at the age of eight, Fox signed his first professional contract in May 2018.

On 30 August 2018, Fox made the move to League One side, Wycombe Wanderers on loan until January 2019. Five days later, he made his professional debut during a 1–0 away victory over Northampton Town in their EFL Trophy group-stage tie. Fox went onto appear just once more before returning to Queens Park Rangers in the new year.

On 22 February 2019, Fox was sent out on loan to non-league side, Basingstoke Town on a one-month deal.

On 1 May 2019, it was announced that Fox would leave Queens Park Rangers at the end of the 2018–19 season.

Non-League
On 1 August 2019, Fox joined National League South side Hampton & Richmond Borough. Fox then moved on just a month later to join Walton Casuals, scoring a last-minute winner on his debut.

On 5 April 2021, it was announced that Fox had joined National League side Bromley.

Queen's Park
Fox moved to Scottish club Queen's Park on 15 July 2021. He scored on his league debut for the club, a 1–1 draw against East Fife on 31 July. Fox played an instrumental part in Queen's Park's promotion to the Scottish Championship in May 2022, helping his side beat Airdrie 3-2 on aggregate. In June 2022, Fox extended his contract until the end of the 2022-23 season.

Career statistics

References

External links

1998 births
Living people
English footballers
Association football defenders
Queens Park Rangers F.C. players
Wycombe Wanderers F.C. players
Basingstoke Town F.C. players
Hampton & Richmond Borough F.C. players
Walton Casuals F.C. players
Bromley F.C. players
Queen's Park F.C. players
English Football League players
Southern Football League players
National League (English football) players